The Pareek are found in the state of Rajasthan in India and are mostly concentrated in the districts of Ajmer, Nagaur, Jodhpur, Bikaner, Sikar, Churu and Jaipur.  Pareek community members belong to Brahmin caste, the highest caste under the Hindu Varna system. According to Hindu mythology, the Pareek community traces their lineage to Maharishi Parashara.

References

Brahmin communities of Rajasthan